The 17th Mieczysław Połukard Criterium of Polish Speedway League Aces was the 1998 version of the Mieczysław Połukard Criterium of Polish Speedway Leagues Aces. It took place on March 29 in the Polonia Stadium in Bydgoszcz, Poland.

Starting positions draw 

 Tomasz Bajerski - Pergo Gorzów Wlkp.
 Jacek Gollob - Jutrzenka-Polonia Bydgoszcz
 Mirosław Kowalik - Apator-DGG Toruń
 Roman Jankowski - Unia Leszno
 Robert Sawina - Trilux-Start Gniezno
 Sebastian Ułamek - Włókniarz-Malma Częstochowa
 Grzegorz Walasek - ZKŻ Polmos Zielona Góra
 Tomasz Gollob - Jutrzenka-Polonia Bydgoszcz
 Robert Dados - Kunterszyn-GKM Grudziądz
 Rafał Dobrucki - Polonia Piła
 Dariusz Śledź - Atlas Wrocław
 Jacek Gomólski - Jutrzenka-Polonia Bydgoszcz
 Piotr Świst - Van Pur Rzeszów
 Piotr Protasiewicz - Jutrzenka-Polonia Bydgoszcz
 Sławomir Drabik - Włókniarz-Malma Częstochowa
 Jacek Krzyżaniak - Apator-DGG Toruń
 (R1) Tomasz Poprawski - Jutrzenka-Polonia Bydgoszcz
 (R2) Dariusz Patynek - Jutrzenka-Polonia Bydgoszcz

Heat details

Sources 
 Roman Lach - Polish Speedway Almanac

See also 

Criterium of Aces
Mieczyslaw Polukard
Mieczysław Połukard Criterium of Polish Speedway Leagues Aces